Eko Atlantic, officially Nigeria International Commerce city, also known as Eko Atlantic City, or the initials E.A.C. and E.A., is a planned city of Lagos State, Nigeria, being constructed on land reclaimed from the Atlantic Ocean. Upon completion, the new peninsula is anticipating at least 250,000 residents and a daily flow of 150,000 commuters.  The development is also designed to help in stopping the erosion of Lagos city's coastline.

The city adjoins Victoria Island district of Lagos city, and the Phase 1 area of Lekki to the north, while the entire Western, eastern and southern borders is a coastline.

Eko Atlantic development is being carried out as a Public–private partnership (PPP)with private companies and investors providing the funding, whilst Lagos State Government(LASG) is a strategic partner, with the support of the Federal Government.(Nigeria Government) The Contractors are China Communications Construction Group LTD(CCCC), a company that works in the field of marine dredging and landfill operation. Consultants are Royal Haskoning (traffic and transport expertise) and ar+h Architects. South Energyx Nigeria Ltd., a subsidiary of the Chagoury group, was specifically created to undertake the development. Testing of the sea defence system took place at the DHI Institute in Copenhagen, Denmark, where models were successfully tested for one-in-a-hundred-year ocean surges, and one-in-120-year, one-in-150-year and one-in-1,000-year storms.

Overview

Eko Atlantic will satisfy needs for financial, commercial, residential and tourist accommodations, with infrastructure in line with modern and environmental standards[this document does not show which environmental standards are used neither if Eko Atlantic is in line with any environmental standard]. These standards will offer the city’s residents water, waste management, security and transportation systems. The city will also have an independent source of energy generated specifically for the city.

Eko Atlantic is situated on land reclaimed from erosion and is protected by a coastal revetment designed by Royal Haskoning colloquially known as the Great Wall of Lagos, a planned 8.5 km long barrier constructed primarily of rock and faced with concrete accropode armour.

The Eko Atlantic City project received global attention in 2009, as the Lagos State Government and its private sector partners on the Project, South Energyx, received the Clinton Global Initiative Commitment Certificate.

Districts
Eko Atlantic is master-planned to contain seven districts which are as follows:

Harbour Lights
Business District
Marina
Downtown
Avenues
Eko Drive
Ocean Front

Milestones

As of May 2009, while the project was still in its dredging phase, about  have been sand-filled and placed in the reclamation area, while about 35,000 tonnes of rock have been delivered to the site.  In certain parts of Bar Beach, the land being reclaimed can already be seen. Dredgers are working around the clock to fill the site with sand.

On 21 February 2013, a dedication ceremony was held at the reclaimed land of Eko Atlantic, with Goodluck Jonathan, Bill Clinton, Babatunde Fashola, Bola Tinubu, Aminu Tambuwal, and Ibikunle Amosun attending.

In March 2014, David Frame, managing director of South Energyx Nigeria Ltd., the firm responsible for the development, confirmed that "The first residential tower will open in 2016".

By November 2020, a few buildings most notably Eko Pearl Towers have been completed with several more under construction and at planning stages. The city has become an active venue for popular afro-concerts and sports events like the Lagos City Marathon and Copa Lagos.  Eko Atlantic City has also secured an EDGE certification from the International Finance Corporation (IFC), a member of the World Bank Group.

Controversy 

The Eko Atlantic project has been criticized by local residents living nearby, saying that ongoing construction works have caused coastal erosion and ocean surges; as ocean water surges through living areas, flooding access roads and taking down electricity poles and forcing residents to relocate. The Lagos State Government is also being criticized for failing to involve the people in the project.

In August 2012, the Atlantic Ocean surged and overflowed its banks, sweeping 16 people into the Atlantic Ocean, killing several people and flooding Kuramo Beach, Victoria Island and other areas. According to an environmental expert, "the ocean surge occurred as a result of the failure of the contractors handling the sandfilling activities of the proposed Atlantic Ocean City, to put in place measure that would reduce the effect of the surge on the environment". The Lagos State chapter of the People's Democratic Party issued an official statement, blaming the ACN (now APC)  -led state government's sand filling for the ocean surge. The party called for a stop to the Eko Atlantic project and immediate compensation to the bereaved families.

See also
Eko Pearl Towers
Centenary City
Lekki

References

Further reading

 New Yorker (magazine). 2013 article
 Wall Street Journal. 2013 article
 The Guardian (UK). 2014 article

External links

Atlantic Ocean
Land reclamation
Mixed-use developments in Lagos
Planned cities in Nigeria
Victoria Island, Lagos
Cities in Nigeria